This is a list of the 16 members of the European Parliament for Denmark in the 1989 to 1994 session.

List

References

Sources
List of Danish MEPs (in Danish)

1989
List
Denmark